The Mummy's Curse is a 1944 American Universal Pictures horror film, directed by Leslie Goodwins. It is the third and final sequel to that company's The Mummy's Hand of 1940. The film is the sequel to The Mummy's Ghost (1944) and the fifth entry in Universal Pictures' original Mummy franchise. It marks Lon Chaney, Jr.'s final appearance as Kharis, the Egyptian mummy. The action of this film, which continues the story of Kharis and his beloved Princess Ananka, is supposed to take place in the same swampy location that was the setting of The Mummy's Ghost. While the earlier film was explicitly set in rural Massachusetts, this film strongly implies that the swamp is in Louisiana, with references to Cajuns and bayous.

Plot 
The Southern Engineering Company is trying to drain the local swamp for the public good. However, the efforts are being hampered by the superstitions of the workers, who believe the area to be haunted by the mummy and his bride.

Two representatives of the Scripps Museum, Dr. James Halsey (Dennis Moore) and Dr. Ilzor Zandaab (Peter Coe), arrive on the scene and present their credentials to the head of the project, Pat Walsh (Addison Richards). They have come to search for the missing mummies, buried in the swamp years earlier. Their conversation is interrupted by the news that a workman has been murdered in the swamps. Evidence at the scene convinces Halsey that the murderer has found the mummy of Kharis.

Later that evening, Zandaab sneaks into the swamp and meets Ragheb (Martin Kosleck). Ragheb is a disciple of the Arkam sect, and Zandaab is secretly a High Priest. The follower killed the worker that unearthed Kharis, and has taken the immobile monster to a deserted monastery.

Zandaab explains the legend of Kharis and Ananka to Ragheb as he brews the tana leaves, giving instructions on their use. The old sacristan of the monastery (William Farnum) intrudes on their ritual, and is promptly executed by a risen Kharis.

Meanwhile, the mummy of Ananka (Virginia Christine) rises from the swamp after being partially uncovered by a bulldozer during the excavation. She immerses herself in a pond and the mud is washed away, revealing an attractive young woman.

Cajun Joe (Kurt Katch) finds the girl wandering listlessly in the swamps, calling out the name "Kharis". He takes her to Tante Berthe (Ann Codee), the owner of the local pub, who aids the girl. Later, Kharis finds her there and murders Berthe, as Ananka flees into the night.

Ananka is soon found lying unconscious beside the road by Halsey and Betty Walsh (Kay Harding), the niece of Pat Walsh. While in their care, and although apparently suffering from amnesia, the girl displays an incredible knowledge of ancient Egypt. Her stay at Halsey's camp is again interrupted by the appearance of Kharis, and the kindly physician, Dr. Cooper (Holmes Herbert), is killed. She again takes flight, and Halsey and the others go in search of her.

Fleeing the monster after he attacks and kills Cajun Joe, she comes to Betty's tent seeking refuge. However, Kharis is not far behind. He enters the tent and whisks away his Princess, leaving the horrified Betty unhurt.

Betty asks Ragheb for his help in finding Dr. Halsey. The treacherous disciple has other ideas, and takes her to the monastery instead. Zandaab, having already administered the tana fluid to the young Ananka, is angered to find Ragheb making advances on Betty. He orders her death, but Ragheb kills him instead. Halsey arrives, tracking them from the camp after finding Betty's tent destroyed. A struggle ensues between Ragheb and Halsey, until Kharis intervenes. The creature, sensing Ragheb's betrayal, advances on his former ally.

Locking himself inside a cell-like room, Ragheb is powerless to do anything but watch as Kharis literally brings down the walls on the two of them. Halsey, Betty and the rest find the mummified remains of Ananka in the adjoining room.

Cast

Lon Chaney, Jr. as Kharis the Mummy
Dennis Moore as Dr. James Halsey
Kay Harding as Betty Walsh
Virginia Christine as Princess Ananka
Addison Richards as Pat Walsh
Peter Coe as Dr. Ilzor Zandaab
Martin Kosleck as Ragheb
Kurt Katch as Cajun Joe
Ann Codee as Tante Berthe
Holmes Herbert as Dr. Cooper
Napoleon Simpson as Goobie
Charles Stevens as Achilles
William Farnum as Watchman at the Church Ruins

Tom Tyler appears as Kharis in the flashback sequence through the use of footage from The Mummy's Hand, the second film in the series.

Themes 
This film follows the events at the end of the previous film where Ananka and Kharis perish in the swamp. The original working title for this film—the fifth in Universal's Mummy series—was The Mummy's Return.

Production 
The Mummy's Curse made use of footage from two of Universal's previous mummy films, The Mummy (1932) and The Mummy's Hand (1940).

In the book It Came from Bob's Basement: Exploring the Science Fiction and Monster Movie Archive of Bob Burns, a book by horror and film collector Bob Burns, Burns has the last surviving piece of Jack Pierce's makeup which is the mask worn by Lon Chaney Jr. in this film.

Release 
The Mummy's Curse was released to theaters on December 22, 1944.

Home media 
The Mummy's Curse was released on DVD in 2004 as part of the Universal Legacy Collection. It was also released on Blu-Ray in 2016 with the same Mummy films, including one starring Abbott and Costello. The only special feature on the single disc is the theatrical trailer, while the other films have making-of documentaries, trailers, commentaries, interviews, and original poster artwork.

Reception

Critical response 
The Mummy's Curse generally received moderate to poor reviews with criticism aimed at the use of stock footage and the confusion of the location of the story as New England is not known for its swamp areas. It holds a 44% fresh rating at the movie review site Rotten Tomatoes.

References

Bibliography

External links 

 
 
 
 
Review of film at Variety

1944 films
1940s fantasy films
1944 horror films
American black-and-white films
American supernatural horror films
American sequel films
Films scored by William Lava
Films directed by Leslie Goodwins
Films set in Louisiana
Mummy films
Universal Pictures films
American fantasy films
Films scored by Paul Sawtell
1940s English-language films
1940s American films